Little Goose Creek is a tributary of Goose Creek river in Clay County with headwaters in Laurel County in the U.S. state of Kentucky.

Tributaries and post offices 
The tributaries are:
 Hooker Branch
 Urban Branch, renamed for the postoffice and originally named Philpot Branch after its postmasters
 Kinkead Branch (also spelled Kinkaid)

Urban postoffice was established on 1898-03-17 by husband and wife postmasters Granville V. and Millie Philpot on Philpot Branch of Little Goose.

Rockgap postoffice was established on 1904-06-10 by Catharine Philpot and ran to October 1915.
It was named for a Rock Gap that it was at, or near; whose own location is unclear.
One 1914 (Selliers') geological survey map assigns it to a small stream 1 mile upstream of Philpot/Urban Branch; other 20th century maps place it west of that branch between Seeley postoffice, the postoffices of Byron and Marydell, and Laurel County.

Sory postoffice was established on 1926-07-91 by postmaster Margaret Bowling Garrison, named after a friend of her husband J.B. from World War One.
It being located close to the mouth of Rader Creek, her first choice of name was in fact Rader.
It closed in June 1933.

Hooker postoffice was established om 1905-04-06 by Matilda L. Craft and closed in 1974.
It was probably named after local family James and Emily Hooker.
Originally located 1 mile up the Hooker Branch tributary of Little Goose Creek, itself a tributary of Goose Creek, sometime before 1939 it moved roughly  further up the branch to roughly the location of the Daniel Boone Parkway.

Grays Fork 
Grays Fork of Little Goose was the location of Grace and Tinker post offices; the latter established at the mouth of Tinker Fork near Bethany Chapel on 1889-12-31 by postmaster Francis M. Eagle and running to July 1938, at two locations along the fork.
Eagle originally wanted to use his own surname, but then chose the creek name.

The story of the name of Grace postoffice is that United States Congressman John D. White was so impressed with the work of his housekeeper Grace Kelly (1880–1956) that he suggested her name when the new postoffice was being established.
Kelly, the daughter of George Kelly of Goose Rock, married Harry Jerome Nicholson in 1903 and some time later moved to Indiana.

It was subsequently moved twice: in 1912 to Goslin Branch by Philip Fields, and sometime before its closure in 1975 one mile down Grays Fork.

See also
List of rivers of Kentucky

References

Sources

Further reading 

 
 

Rivers of Kentucky
Rivers of Clay County, Kentucky